The 2018–19 Cayman Islands Premier League was the 40th season of the Cayman Islands Premier League, the top division football competition in the Cayman Islands. The season began on 3 November 2018. The season ended on 17 March 2019 and Scholars International won their 12th league title.

League table

The 4 November match between North Side and Tigers was abandoned following a fight between the two clubs, causing both clubs to be awarded a 0–3 loss.

References

Cayman Islands Premier League seasons
Cayman Islands
Prem